Adoniram Judson Warner (January 13, 1834 – August 12, 1910) was a U.S. Representative from Ohio and an officer in the Union Army during the American Civil War.

Biography 
Born in Wales, New York (near Buffalo, New York), Warner moved with his parents to Wisconsin at the age of eleven.  He attended school in Beloit, Wisconsin, and New-York Central College. He was principal of Lewistown (Pennsylvania) Academy, superintendent of the public schools of Mifflin County, Pennsylvania, and principal of Mercer Union School, Pennsylvania from 1856 to 1861.  He was commissioned as captain in the Tenth Pennsylvania Reserves on July 21, 1861, promoted to lieutenant colonel on May 14, 1862 and became colonel on April 25, 1863. He was transferred into the Veteran Reserve Corps in November 1863. On January 13, 1866, President Andrew Johnson nominated Warner for appointment to the grade of brevet brigadier general of volunteers, to rank from March 13, 1865, and the United States Senate confirmed the appointment on March 12, 1866.

Warner studied law and was admitted to the bar in Indianapolis, Indiana in 1865 but never practiced. At the conclusion of the war, he returned to Pennsylvania, and in 1866 moved to Marietta, Ohio. He engaged in the oil, coal, and railroad businesses.

Warner was elected as a Democrat to the Forty-sixth Congress (March 4, 1879 – March 3, 1881). He was an unsuccessful candidate for reelection in 1880 to the Forty-seventh Congress.

Warner was elected to the Forty-eighth and Forty-ninth Congresses (March 4, 1883 – March 3, 1887). He was not a candidate for reelection in 1886. He served as delegate to the 1896 Democratic National Convention. He engaged in street railway construction in the District of Columbia and in railroad construction in Ohio. From about 1898 until six months before his death, he engaged in transportation and power development in Georgia. He died in Marietta, Ohio August 12, 1910. He was interred in Oak Grove Cemetery.

See also 

List of American Civil War brevet generals (Union)

Notes

References 
Eicher, John H., and David J. Eicher, Civil War High Commands. Stanford: Stanford University Press, 2001. .

1834 births
1910 deaths
Pennsylvania Reserves
Union Army colonels
People of Pennsylvania in the American Civil War
People from Wales, New York
Politicians from Marietta, Ohio
19th-century American railroad executives
School superintendents in Pennsylvania
19th-century American politicians
Educators from New York (state)
Educators from Ohio
Democratic Party members of the United States House of Representatives from Ohio
American school principals